"I Got You Babe" is a song recorded by R&B group DeBarge and released as the second single from their fifth studio album, Bad Boys.

The song peaked at number 73 on the U.S. R&B chart and did not chart on the Billboard Hot 100.

Charts

Credits
Lead vocals: Bobby DeBarge

DeBarge songs
1987 songs
1988 singles
Song articles with missing songwriters